Final Impact is a 1992 Direct-To-Video martial arts film starring Jeff Langton, Mimi Lesseos, Lorenzo Lamas and Michael Worth. It was directed by Joseph Merhi and Stephen Smoke. The film was shot in 18 days.

Plot summary
Nick Taylor was once a champion in the sport of kickboxing. However, when the brutal Jake Gerard defeats him, Nick not only loses the title, but he also loses his wife Roxy to Gerard. Nick now spends his time drinking and reminiscing about his heavy loss. However, one day, a young upstart from Ohio has arrived. His name is Danny Davis and he wants Nick to train him. Nick is not sure Danny has what it takes to prove himself, so Nick takes him to a club with a kickboxing ring, hires a fellow kickboxer and tells him to face Danny. Danny is able to defeat Nick's fighter and tells Nick he's invincible.

The next day, Nick tests Danny himself and, when Danny fails, Nick tells him 'nobody is invincible', but he offers to train him. As Danny and Nick begin to train, a bond strengthens between the two. Nick's somewhat unstable relationship with local waitress Maggie also begins to get better. Nick finally finds himself in a comfortable place as he gets Danny ready for an upcoming tournament to determine who will become the next World Champion in Las Vegas. As Danny begins to win matches, Nick becomes proud of himself as a mentor. However, when Jake arrives with Roxy, the two play mind games with Nick. Nick slowly begins to regress again while training Danny. When Nick decides enough is enough, he challenges Jake to a fight on a rooftop. However, Jake decimates Nick to the point where Nick ends up in the hospital fighting for his life. In the hospital, Nick talks to Danny and Maggie, expressing his regret for what he had done and wishes Danny the best in the finals against Jake. Shortly after that, Nick dies in his hospital bed.

At the finals of the World Championships, Jake overpowers Danny at first. However, with Maggie's full support and remembering his training with Nick, Danny finally defeats Jake with a series of kicks, ranging from a side kick to numerous roundhouses, and ending it with a flying wushu-style half-butterfly kick, knocking Jake out. Danny wins the championship and both he and Maggie look at each other and smile as Danny gets the title belt, celebrating his victory.

Cast
 Lorenzo Lamas as Nick Taylor
 Jeff Langton as Jake Gerard
 Mimi Lesseos as Roxy Taylor
 Kathleen Kinmont as Maggie
 Michael Worth as Danny Davis
 Frank Rivera as Stevie (Credited as Frank Reeves)
 Mike Toney as Joe
 Kathrin Lautner as Girl In Bar
 Chuck Hull as Ring Announcer
 James M. Williams as Commentator
 Michelle Grassnick as Oil Wrestler
 Erika Nann as Oil Wrestler
 Antoinette Steen as Referee
 Kevin McCaulley as Referee
 Earle A. Armstrong as Fighter
 Roman Neri as Fighter
 Gary Daniels as Jimmy, Nick's Club Fighter
 Lance Harris as Fighter
 Ian Jacklin as Fighter
 Azhakd Fariborz as Fighter
 Art Camacho as Fighter
 Anthony Gamboa as Fighter
 Darrell Powell as Fighter
 Jon Kinikama as Fighter
 Ken Doyle as Fighter
 Fred Vanden Akker as Fighter
 Miguel Hierro as Fighter
 Joseph L. Salomone as Fighter

References

External links
 

1991 films
1990s English-language films
1991 action films
American martial arts films
Kickboxing films
1991 martial arts films
Films directed by Joseph Merhi
1990s American films